Rispal is a French surname. Notable people with this surname include:

 Adeline Rispal (born 1955), French architect
 Danièle Hoffman-Rispal (1951–2020), French politician
 Jacques Rispal (1923–1986), French actor
 Kareen Rispal, French politician
 Léo Rispal (born 2000), French singer